Thorn Simpson (born 22 February 1998) is a Jamaican professional footballer who plays as a striker for USL League One club North Carolina FC on loan from Molynes United.

Club career
Simpson began his career in Jamaica, playing for Harbour View, Reno, UWI, and Molynes United.

On 14 May 2021, Simpson was loaned to USL League One side North Carolina FC. His debut for North Carolina FC came on 22 May in a goalless draw vs. Richmond Kickers. His first goal came on 18 July vs. Toronto FC II.

References

External links
 Profile at North Carolina FC

1998 births
Living people
Jamaican footballers
Association football forwards
Harbour View F.C. players
UWI F.C. players
Molynes United F.C. players
North Carolina FC players
Jamaican expatriate footballers
Jamaican expatriate sportspeople in the United States
Expatriate soccer players in the United States
National Premier League players
USL League One players